Colima is a genus of spiders in the family Zodariidae (ant spiders), found in the state of Colima, Mexico.

Description
Colima species are medium-sized spiders, with a body length of 3.5–6.0 mm. The fourth leg is longest. The cephalothorax (prosoma) is pale orange to pale brown in colour; the abdomen is mostly darker with a paler pattern of chevrons and spots.

Taxonomy
The genus was erected in 2006 by Rudy Jocqué and Léon Baert for two new species from the Mexican state of Colima. The generic name is based on this location. Colima is distinguished from related genera by the very high clypeus and the shape of the male palpal bulb: the tegulum is horseshoe-shaped and the embolus is mostly hidden in a hollow in the tegulum.

Species
, the World Spider Catalog accepted the following species:
 Colima colima Jocqué & Baert, 2006 – Mexico
 Colima manzanillo Jocqué & Baert, 2006 – Mexico

References

Zodariidae
Araneomorphae genera
Spiders of Mexico